Viscount Windsor is a title that has been created twice.

The first creation came in the Peerage of Ireland in 1699 when the Honourable Thomas Windsor was made Viscount Windsor, of Blackcastle. He was the younger son of Thomas Hickman-Windsor, 1st Earl of Plymouth, and notably represented Droitwich, Bramber and Monmouthshire in the House of Commons. In 1712 he was created Baron Mountjoy in the Peerage of Great Britain, giving him a seat in the House of Lords at Westminster, one of Harley's Dozen. Windsor was a descendant of Andrew Windsor, 1st Baron Windsor and the Honourable Elizabeth Blount, sister of Edward Blount, 2nd Baron Mountjoy, hence his choice of title (see also Baron Mountjoy). He was succeeded by his son, the second Viscount. He sat as Member of Parliament for Cardiff. On his death in 1758 the titles became extinct. His daughter and heiress, the Honourable Charlotte Jane Windsor, married John Stuart, 4th Earl of Bute. In 1796 he was created Viscount Mountjoy, Earl of Windsor and Marquess of Bute.

The second creation came in the Peerage of the United Kingdom in 1905 when Robert Windsor-Clive, 14th Baron Windsor, was made Viscount Windsor, of St Fagans in the County of Glamorgan. He was made Earl of Plymouth at the same time. For more information on this creation of the viscountcy, see the latter title.

Viscounts Windsor (1699, first creation)
Thomas Windsor, 1st Viscount Windsor (1669–1738)
Herbert Windsor, 2nd Viscount Windsor (1707–1758)

Viscounts Windsor (1905, second creation)
see Earl of Plymouth

See also
 Baron Windsor
 Duke of Windsor

Notes

References
Kidd, Charles, Williamson, David (editors). Debrett's Peerage and Baronetage (1990 edition). New York: St Martin's Press, 1990, 

Extinct viscountcies in the Peerage of Ireland
Noble titles created in 1699
Noble titles created in 1905
Viscountcies in the Peerage of the United Kingdom